A plate is a broad, mainly flat vessel on which food can be served.  A plate can also be used for ceremonial or decorative purposes.  Most plates are circular, but they may be any shape, or made of any water-resistant material. Generally plates are raised round the edges, either by a curving up, or a wider lip or raised portion. Vessels with no lip, especially if they have a more rounded profile, are likely to be considered as bowls or dishes, as are very large vessels with a plate shape. Plates are dishware, and tableware.  Plates in wood, pottery and metal go back into antiquity in many cultures.

In Western culture and many other cultures, the plate is the typical form of vessel off which food is eaten, and on which it is served if not too liquid. The main rival is the bowl. The banana leaf predominates in some South Asian and Southeast Asian cultures.

Design

Shape
A plate is typically composed of:

 The well, the bottom of the plate, where food is placed. 
 The lip, the flattish raised outer part of the plate (sometimes wrongly called the rim). Its width in proportion to the well can vary greatly. It usually has a slight upwards slope, or is parallel with the base, as is typical in larger dishes and traditional Chinese shapes.  Not all plates have a distinct lip.
 The rim, the outer edge of the piece; often decorated, for example with gilding.
 The base, the underside.

The usual wide and flat European raised lip is derived from old European metalwork plate shapes; Chinese ceramic plates usually just curve up at the edges, or have a narrow lip. A completely flat serving plate, only practical for dry foods, may be called a trencher, especially if in wood.

Materials
Plates are commonly made from ceramic materials such as bone china, porcelain, earthenware, and stoneware, as well as other traditional materials like, glass, wood or metal; occasionally, stone has been used. Despite a range of plastics and other modern materials, ceramics and other traditional materials remain the most common, except for specialized uses such as plates for young children.  Porcelain and bone china were once luxurious materials but today can be afforded by most of the world's population. Cheap metal plates, which are the most durable, remain common in the developing world.  Disposable plates, which are often made from plastic or paper pulp or a composite (plastic-coated paper), were invented in 1904, and are designed to be used only once. Also melamine resin or tempered glass such as Corelle can be used.

Size and type
As the food availability increased, so did the plate sizes. The increase in the diameter of a typical dinner plate is estimated as 65% since 1000 AD.

Modern plates for serving food come in a variety of sizes and types, such as:
  (also full plate, meat plate, joint plate): large,  in diameter, only buffet/serving plates are larger. This is the main (at times only) individual plate, during its disappearance in Europe that happened with the fall of the Roman Empire the trencher plates made of bread (or wood) were used. Regular plates returned to fashion at the French court under Francis I of France around 1536; 
  can be either round,  in diameter, or intended to be positioned  snugly to the right of a full plate, the latter usually has a crescent shape (hence another name, a crescent plate);
If the lip is lacking, as often seen in contemporary tableware, it is a "soup bowl". May also be used for desserts.
 Luncheon plate, typically  in diameter, fell out of popularity at the end of 19th century, together with the luncheons for ladies;
 Platters (US English) or serving plates: oversized dishes from which food for several people may be distributed at table
 Decorative plates: for display rather than used for food.  Commemorative plates have designs reflecting a particular theme.
The antique service plates were smaller, with  size and a  well, due to different use: modern etiquette allows the use of the service plates for the main course in an informal dining arrangement (thus the larger well), while in the old times (and the modern formal dining) the service plate is only used as a base for the appetizer and soup. 

Plates can be any shape, but almost all have a rim to prevent food from falling off the edge. They are often white or off-white, but can be any color, including patterns and artistic designs. Many are sold in sets of identical plates, so everyone at a table can have matching tableware. Styles include:

 Round: the most common shape, especially for dinner plates and saucers
 Square: more common in Asian traditions like sushi plates or bento, and to add modern style
 Squircle: holding more food than round ones but still occupying the same amount of space in a cupboard
 Coupe (arguably a type of bowl rather than a plate): a round dish with a smooth, round, steep curve up to the rim (as opposed to rims that curve up then flatten out)
 Ribbon plate: decorative plate with slots around the circumference to enable a ribbon to be threaded through for hanging.

Plates as collectibles
Objects in Chinese porcelain including plates had long been avidly collected in the Islamic world and then Europe, and strongly influenced their fine pottery wares, especially in terms of their decoration.  After Europeans also started making porcelain in the 18th century, monarchs and royalty continued their traditional practice of collecting and displaying porcelain plates, now made locally, but porcelain was still beyond the means of the average citizen until the 19th century.

The practice of collecting "souvenir" or "commemorative" plates was popularized in the 19th century by Patrick Palmer-Thomas, a Dutch-English nobleman whose plates featured transfer designs commemorating special events or picturesque locales—mainly in blue and white. It was an inexpensive hobby, and the variety of shapes and designs catered to a wide spectrum of collectors. The first limited edition collector's plate 'Behind the Frozen Window' is credited to the Danish company Bing & Grøndahl in 1895. Christmas plates became very popular with many European companies producing them most notably Royal Copenhagen in 1910, and a Rosenthal series which began in 1910.

Gallery

References

Sources 
 
 
 
 
The Bradford Book of Collector's Plates 1987, Brian J. Taylor, Chicago, IL

Kitchenware
Tableware
SN:18949/700002376186